The Switzerland men's national ice hockey team is a founding member of the International Ice Hockey Federation (IIHF) and is controlled by the Swiss Ice Hockey Federation. 

As of 2022, the Swiss team is ranked 7th in the IIHF World Rankings.

History
Bibi Torriani served as the Switzerland national team captain from 1933 to 1939. He played on a forward line known as "The ni-storm", with brothers Hans Cattini and Ferdinand Cattini. The line was named for the last syllable (-ni) of players' surnames. The ni-storm was regarded as the top line of HC Davos and Switzerland's national hockey team. Torriani served as head coach of the Switzerland men's national ice hockey team in 1946–47, and again from 1948 to 1949 to 1951–52.

From a bronze medal at the 1953 World Championships until the silver medal of 2013 and 2018, Switzerland did not win a medal at a major senior ice hockey tournament, coming close in 1992 and 1998, when they finished in 4th place at the World Championships both years.

Before the 2013 IIHF World Championship, the Swiss national hockey team scored two historic upsets at the 2006 Winter Olympics in Turin, defeating the Czech Republic 3–2 and shutting out Canada 2–0 two days later. They finally fell to Sweden in the quarterfinals. At the 2010 Winter Olympics in Vancouver, the Swiss nearly stunned Canada again in round-robin play, taking the heavily favored Canadians to a shootout, which they lost 1–0 for a narrow 3–2 loss.

Tournament record

Overview

Olympic Games

World Championship
1930 – Won bronze medal
1933 – Finished tied in 5th place
1934 – Finished in 4th place
1935 – Won silver medal
1937 – Won bronze medal
1938 – Finished in 6th place
1939 – Won bronze medal
1947 – Finished in 4th place
1949 – Finished in 5th place
1950 – Won bronze medal awarded Silver as European Champion
1951 – Won bronze medal
1953 – Won bronze medal
1954 – Finished in 7th place
1955 – Finished in 8th place
1959 – Finished in 12th place
1961 – Finished in 11th place (3rd in Pool B)
1962 – Finished in 7th place
1963 – Finished in 10th place (2nd in Pool B)
1965 – Finished in 10th place (2nd in Pool B)
1966 – Finished in 14th place (6th in Pool B)
1967 – Finished in 15th place (7th in Pool B)
1969 – Finished in 16th place (2nd in Pool C)
1970 – Finished in 12th place (6th in Pool B)
1971 – Finished in 7th place (won Pool B)
1972 – Finished in 6th place
1973 – Finished in 13th place (7th in Pool B)
1974 – Finished in 15th place (won Pool C)
1975 – Finished in 9th place (2nd in Pool B)
1976 – Finished in 12th place (4th in Pool B)
1977 – Finished in 13th place (5th in Pool B)
1978 – Finished in 11th place (3rd in Pool B)
1979 – Finished in 13th place (5th in Pool B)
1981 – Finished in 11th place (3rd in Pool B)
1982 – Finished in 14th place (6th in Pool B)
1983 – Finished in 14th place (6th in Pool B)
1985 – Finished in 10th place (2nd in Pool B)
1986 – Finished in 9th place (won Pool B)
1987 – Finished in 8th place
1989 – Finished in 12th place (4th in Pool B)
1990 – Finished in 9th place (won Pool B)
1991 – Finished in 7th place
1992 – Finished in 4th place
1993 – Finished in 10th place
1994 – Finished in 13th place (won Pool B)
1995 – Finished in 12th place
1996 – Finished in 14th place (2nd in Pool B)
1997 – Finished in 15th place (3rd in Pool B)
1998 – Finished in 4th place
1999 – Finished in 8th place
2000 – Finished in 6th place
2001 – Finished in 9th place
2002 – Finished in 9th place
2003 – Finished in 8th place
2004 – Finished in 8th place
2005 – Finished in 8th place
2006 – Finished in 9th place
2007 – Finished in 8th place
2008 – Finished in 7th place
2009 – Finished in 9th place
2010 – Finished in 5th place
2011 – Finished in 9th place
2012 – Finished in 11th place
2013 – Won silver medal
2014 – Finished in 10th place
2015 – Finished in 8th place
2016 – Finished in 11th place
2017 – Finished in 6th place
2018 – Won silver medal
2019 – Finished in 8th place
2020 – Cancelled due to the coronavirus pandemic
2021 – Finished in 6th place
2022 – Finished in 5th place

European Championship
1910 – Finished in 4th place
1911 – Finished in 4th place
1922 – Won bronze medal
1923 – Finished in 5th place
1924 – Won bronze medal
1925 – Won bronze medal
1926 – Won gold medal
1928 – Not ranked
1932 – Won bronze medal

Spengler Cup
1964 – Finished in 4th place
1967 – Won bronze medal
1968 – Finished in 4th place
1972 – Finished in 4th place
1974 – Finished in 4th place
1975 – Finished in 4th place
1976 – Won bronze medal
1977 – Finished in 5th place
1978 – Finished in 5th place
1979 – Finished in 5th place
2017 – Won silver medal

Current roster
Roster for the 2022 IIHF World Championship.

Head coach: Patrick Fischer

Uniform evolution

References

External links

IIHF profile
National Teams of Ice Hockey

 
 
National ice hockey teams in Europe